Hartland Quay is located on the Atlantic coast of Devon, England, south of Hartland Point and north of Bude, Cornwall. It experiences some of the roughest seas in winter and is a former harbour.

History
The harbour dated back to the time of Henry VIII until a storm led to the complete destruction of the pier head and later the whole pier wall in 1887. Parts of the old formation stones can be seen at low tide. As well as evidence of a counter pier. The only evidence visible at all times is the lyme kiln. The old Customs House has been a hotel since 1886 and its former stables are now 'The Wrecker's Retreat' bar. The former corn and hay lofts are now hotel bedrooms. In 'The Wrecker's Retreat' are displayed memorabilia charting the history of Hartland Quay as well as displays of shipwrecks on the coast over the centuries. Also shown are the various films and television shows that have been filmed here. The former Coastguard cottages are now toilets, still a private residence, shop and museum of the quay. Current access to the sea and beach is provided by a slipway.

Film location

Hartland Quay has featured in a number of films, including Treasure Island (1950), The War Zone (1995), Element of Doubt (1996), Solomon Kane (2009), and Rebecca (2020).

Shipwrecks
Several ships have been wrecked at Hartland Quay including SS Rosalia and SS Ginetorix. 19th century wrecks included Edward & Ann (1809), Test (1843), Eclipse (1865), Jenny Jones (1868), Zuma (1871), Deux Freres (1885), Royal Saxon (1886), Londos (1891), and Clipper (1895). Numerous other vessels have come to grief at Hartland Point, a few miles to the north.

Amenities
Hartland Quay is a popular local tourist destination and offers a view into an historic maritime past as well as accommodation, museum, unusual rock formations, rock pools and sandy coves.
The Quay is at the start of one of the most challenging sections of the South West Coast Path.
Hartland Quay hosts motorcycle hill climb events.

References

External links

Ports and harbours of Devon
Hartland, Devon